Niedźwiedzice may refer to the following places in Poland:
Niedźwiedzice, Legnica County in Gmina Chojnów, Legnica County in Lower Silesian Voivodeship (SW Poland)
Niedźwiedzice, Wałbrzych County in Gmina Walim, Wałbrzych County in Lower Silesian Voivodeship (SW Poland)